The Lost Jim Lava Flow, located in the heart of the Seward Peninsula in Alaska, is a Holocene lava flow in the Bering Land Bridge National Preserve. The name originates from a member of a USGS research team who became separated from the rest of the group while mapping the lava flow in 1947.

References

Landforms of Nome Census Area, Alaska
Landforms of Northwest Arctic Borough, Alaska
Landforms of the Seward Peninsula
Volcanism of Alaska
Lava flows